An Cumann Gaelach is the Irish language and culture society in the University of Dublin, Trinity College (Irish: Ollscoil Átha Cliath, Coláiste na Tríonóide). Established in 1907 by Ireland's first president Dubhghlas de hÍde, the society is among the largest societies in Trinity College, and one of the largest Cumann Gaelach student groups in the country.

Overview
The society organises events catering for speakers of Irish and those with an interest in the language and culture. Society events include céilíthe, debates, lectures, concerts, conversation classes. The beginning of Hilary term is also set aside for Éigse na Tríonóide, a week dedicated to the Irish language in Trinity College. The society publishes the Irish language college magazine, Tuathal four times over the course of the year. The publication has been nominated for Society Publication of the Year in Ireland's National Student Media Awards. The society won the National Glór na nGael competition for Best 3rd Level Irish Society in the country for the first time in 2012, repeating this feat in 2013.

A campaign spearheaded by the society to open an Irish language common room on campus was successful in 2012 when Raidió na Gaeltachta presenter Seán Bán Breathnach opened college's Seomra na Gaeilge.

An Cumann Gaelach operates within the scope of Trinity College's Irish Language Scheme which aims to outline the services that students can avail of through Irish.

See also
 An Cumann Gaelach, QUB

References

External links
An Cumann Gaelach - official website

Celtic language advocacy organizations
Student language societies
Trinity College Dublin